Onagrodes is a genus of moths in the family Geometridae.

Species
Onagrodes barbarula Prout, 1958
Onagrodes eucineta Prout, 1958
Onagrodes obscurata Warren, 1896
Onagrodes oosyndica Prout, 1958
Onagrodes recurva Warren, 1907
Onagrodes victoria Prout, 1958

References

External links

Eupitheciini